Coor is the name of:
 Lattie F. Coor (born 1936), American academic
 Coor Crags, a landform in Antarctica

COOR might be a chemical formula for an ester.

See also 
 Coore, a village in Ireland
 Coors (disambiguation)
 Corr (disambiguation)
 Koor (disambiguation)